Lameck Kauzi Chibombamilimo (25 May 1961 – 9 August 2010) was a Zambian politician.

Biography
Chibombamilimo worked as a teacher before entering politics. In the 2006 general elections he ran as the Movement for Multi-Party Democracy candidate in Mpulungu and was elected to the National Assembly with 85% of the vote. Later in the year he was appointed Minister for Northern Province. In November 2008 he became Deputy Minister of Energy and Water Development.

However, in February 2009 Chibombamilimo was sacked by President Rupiah Banda after being accused of disloyalty. In 2010 he became critically ill with kidney problems and was flown to New Delhi for a transplant. However, he died on 9 August.

References 

1961 births
Zambian educators
Members of the National Assembly of Zambia
Movement for Multi-Party Democracy politicians
Provincial Ministers of Zambia
2010 deaths